Krajkovići may refer to the following places in Bosnia and Herzegovina:

Krajkovići, Konjic
Krajkovići, Trebinje